"Only Love Can Save Me Now" is a song written by Tom Shapiro, Chris Waters and Bucky Jones, and recorded by American country music artist Crystal Gayle. Originally included on her 1986 studio album Straight to the Heart, it was released in October 1987 as the only single from the compilation album The Best of Crystal Gayle. The song reached number 11 on the Billboard Hot Country Singles & Tracks chart.

Chart performance

References

1987 singles
1986 songs
Crystal Gayle songs
Songs written by Tom Shapiro
Songs written by Chris Waters
Song recordings produced by Jim Ed Norman
Warner Records singles
Songs written by Bucky Jones